Southend Radio was a local adult contemporary radio station broadcasting to Southend on Sea, in Essex, England from studios in The Icon Building on Southend Seafront, owned by the Adventure Radio Group. It merged in 2015 with Chelmsford Radio to create Radio Essex

History
The station was awarded its licence to broadcast in October 2005, beating three rival bids. Southend Radio began broadcasting on 28 March 2008 after a month of test transmissions.

The station simulcasted all of its programmes with its sister station Chelmsford Radio and Radio Essex on DAB digital radio across Essex. Some programmes were also simulcast with other radio stations owned by the Adventure Radio Group. The output was made to 'sound' local by using jingles relevant to the platform that is being listened to.

The 'Essex Action' feature was a community service designed to help local groups and charities with much needed publicity and also with appeals for volunteers. The service was coordinated by the Southend Association of Volunteers (SAVS) with their counterparts across the county contributing items for broadcast.

On 6 June 2013 Southend Radio and sister station Chelmsford Radio launched on DAB under the singular service Radio Essex. The original DAB only Radio Essex was broadcast on the Essex DAB mux and could be heard in many places across the county where Southend Radio couldn't, including Harlow, Colchester, and Sudbury (Suffolk).

In February, 2015 it was announced that Southend Radio, along with Chelmsford Radio and Radio Essex, would be relaunched as one single station known as Radio Essex. The new station launched on 23 March 2015 on 105.1 FM, 107.7 FM, and on DAB.

Notable presenters 

Notable presenters on Southern Radio include Tracie Young and Daryl Denham.

Technical 

Southend Radio was broadcast on 105.1 MHz from a transmitter located at the top of Maitland House in Southend High Street. The transmitter also broadcasts "Heart Essex".

The signal on 105.1 could be heard right across Southend-on-Sea and most of south east Essex. The signal could also be heard as far away as Clacton, Maldon and also North Kent & Medway.

See also 
 Radio Essex
 Chelmsford Radio
 Connect Radio 106.8
 Connect Radio 97.2 & 107.4
 Mercury 96.6

References

External links
 Southend Radio
 Radio Today - Southend Radio Ready To Go
 Southend Timeline
 Radio Today - Southend and Chelmsford Radio to merge

Radio stations in Essex
Southend-on-Sea (town)
Radio stations established in 2008
Buildings and structures in Southend-on-Sea